State Road 216 (NM 216) is a  state highway in the US state of New Mexico. NM 216's southern terminus is at U.S. Route 285 (US 285) northwest of Loving, and the northern terminus is at US 62, US 180 and US 285 south of Carlsbad.

Major intersections

See also

References

216
Transportation in Eddy County, New Mexico